Ethmia hendersonorum is a moth in the family Depressariidae. The habitat consists of dry forests.

The ground color of the forewings is yellowish, with a series of elongated dark markings and spots over the costal half. The dorsal area is paler with two dark spots. The hindwing ground colour is whitish becoming brownish toward the apex.

Etymology
The species is named in honor of Carrol and Ethelle Henderson for their careers in non-game conservation in Minnesota
and Costa Rica, and support for biodiversity-directed ecotourism of Costa Rica.

References

Moths described in 2014
hendersonorum